Britannia, was a vessel launched in 1783 at Saltcoats. She made two voyages as a slave ship in the triangular trade in enslaved people. She grounded at Liverpool in 1793 after the first. A French privateer captured her in 1795 during the second, and took her to Guadeloupe where the Republican Government almost certainly freed the captives.

First slave voyage (1793–1794)
Lloyd's Register for 1793 shows Britannias master as J. James, her owner as Gregson, and her trade as Liverpool-Africa. She had undergone a thorough repair in 1792.

A database of slave voyages from Liverpool shows that Britannia, Joseph James, master, and John Gregson, owner, had sailed her for West Central Africa and St. Helena on 17 January 1793. James received a letter of marque dated 25 April 1793, i.e., in absentia, war with France having broken out after Britannia had sailed. Joseph James died on 7 November 1793. Captain John Bolton Rooke replaced James. Of her crew of 28, 13 died on the voyage.

She then delivered her slaves to Grenada, arriving on 5 September. She had embarked 361 slaves and she disembarked 331, for a rate of loss of 8.3%.

She arrived at Liverpool on 19 December. As she returned from Grenada to Liverpool, the pilot ran her ashore. Her cargo was saved, but there was doubt as to whether it would be possible to save her too.

Second slave voyage (1795-loss)
Lloyd's Register for 1795 showed Britannia as having undergone a repair in 1794. It gave her master as Wilson, changing to Curry, owner Salisbury changing to R. Bent, and her trade as Lancaster-Martinique, changing to Liverpool-Africa. On 13 October 1795 Gilbert Curry received a letter of marque.

Curry sailed Britannia from Liverpool 17 October 1795 on a slaving voyage though the records do not make clear when and where he gathered his cargo of slaves. Later, in 1796, Britannia was sailing from Africa to the West Indies when the French captured her and took her into Guadeloupe. At the time, Guadeloupe was in the hands of anti-slavery republicans under the leadership of Victor Hugues. Britannia had embarked 359 slaves and she arrived with 328 in Guadeloupe, for a mortality rate of 5.6%.

In 1796, 22 British slave ships were lost whilst engaging in the slave trade. Twelve of the slave ships, including Britannia, were lost on the Middle Passage, while sailing from Africa to the West Indies. War, not maritime hazards or slave resistance, was the greatest cause of vessel losses among British slave vessels between 1793 and 1807.

Notes

Citations

References
 
 

1783 ships
Liverpool slave ships
Captured ships
Age of Sail merchant ships
Merchant ships of the United Kingdom
Maritime incidents in 1793